Ihor Serhiyovych Voronkov (born 24 April 1981) is a Ukrainian and Belarusian former professional footballer.

Career
He spent his entire senior career in Belarus and received Belarusian citizenship in 2010. As of 2020, he plays for Arsenal Dzerzhinsk.

External links
 
 
 

1981 births
Living people
People from Toretsk
Ukrainian footballers
Belarusian footballers
Association football midfielders
Ukrainian expatriate footballers
Expatriate footballers in Belarus
Ukrainian expatriate sportspeople in Belarus
FC Uholyok Myrnohrad players
FC Torpedo-BelAZ Zhodino players
FC Dnepr Mogilev players
FC Minsk players
FC Gomel players
FC Belshina Bobruisk players
FC Dinamo Minsk players
FC Slutsk players
FC Krumkachy Minsk players
FC Smolevichi players
FC Slavia Mozyr players
FC Arsenal Dzerzhinsk players
Sportspeople from Donetsk Oblast